Tropical Storm Andres is one of only three tropical cyclones on record to strike El Salvador. The first named storm of the active 1997 Pacific hurricane season, Andres formed on June 1 off the coast of Mexico. It initially moved toward the coast, although a change in steering winds turned the storm toward Mexico and Guatemala. After passing just offshore, Andres again changed direction toward the southeast, gradually weakening in the process. On June 7, it turned toward and hit El Salvador before dissipating. The storm brought rainfall to coastlines along much of its path, destroying some houses and inflicted damage. Two fishermen were reported missing in Nicaragua due to high seas, and there were four deaths in El Salvador.

Meteorological history

Tropical Storm Andres was the first of many storms of the season, with above-average activity due to one of the strongest El Niño events on record. In most of May 1997, strong westerlies extended across the eastern Pacific Ocean, which inhibited tropical cyclogenesis. Toward the end of the month, however, wind shear decreased in the easternmost portion of the basin, which allowed a low-level circulation to develop; it is possible the system originated from a tropical wave that traversed the Atlantic Ocean in the previous two weeks. Deep convection increased over the circulation on May 31, prompting classifications with the Dvorak technique. Based on satellite imagery, it is estimated the system developed into Tropical Depression One-E early on June 1, about 345 miles (555 km) south of the Gulf of Tehuantepec.

The tropical cyclone was never well-organized, and after its formation, the convection became elongated. As the entire system moved northwestward, another circulation developed which eventually became the dominant center, causing the original circulation to dissipate. Midday on June 2, the depression intensified into Tropical Storm Andres. A trough bypassed the storm to the north and changed the steering flow toward the southeast. This produced a track paralleling the Central America coastline; such a track was considered "unprecedented" by the National Hurricane Center in the database for all eastern Pacific storms. Initially, the storm was expected to continue moving toward Mexico and Guatemala.

Turning southeastward, Tropical Storm Andres passed about 35 miles (55 km) off the coast of Guatemala, before it began weakening due to interaction with the Intertropical Convergence Zone. The convection became amorphous and later shifted to the southeast of the circulation. On June 6 Andres weakened to tropical depression status. It turned northward and moved ashore near San Salvador, El Salvador on June 7, which was the first recorded landfall in the country. The low-level circulation quickly dissipated over land, although the mid-level circulation persisted across Central America. After the featured reached the western Caribbean Sea, a new surface circulation developed, and initially, tropical cyclone forecast models anticipated the development of a significant storm in the eastern Gulf of Mexico. Instead, the system remained disorganized, bringing rainfall to Cuba, Florida, and the Bahamas before it was absorbed by a weak trough in the Gulf of Mexico.

Impact and preparations

When Tropical Storm Andres first turned to the northeast, tropical storm warnings were issued from Punta Galera, Mexico to the Mexico/Guatemala border. A tropical storm warning was later issued from Champerico, Guatemala to the Mexican border. All of the warnings were dropped when Andres turned toward the southeast. Later, a tropical storm watch was issued for Guatemala and El Salvador, but it was quickly canceled. Due to the threat of the storm, officials closed ports along the southern Mexican coastline, and also advised for small boats to excise caution.

Throughout its life, Andres produced rainfall along the coast of Mexico, in Guerrero, Oaxaca, and Chiapas, as well as through the Yucatán Peninsula. The highest total in the country was 11.42 inches (29 cm) in Mazatán, Chiapas. Heavy rainfall and high seas spread across western Central America. In El Salvador and Nicaragua, the storm led to power outages, traffic accidents, and overflown rivers, as well as destroyed bridges and buildings in Nicaragua. Two fishermen were left missing in Nicaragua, and the storm damaged 91 houses and destroyed 82 more, leaving a total of 1,259 people homeless. There were 4 deaths in El Salvador where Andres made landfall. The remnants of Andres brought rainfall to Cuba, Florida, and the Bahamas. In Florida, the system produced a daily record precipitation of 5.89 inches (15 cm) at the Miami International Airport; the rainfall led to street flooding, accidents, and housing damage.

See also
Other storms of the same name
Tropical Storm Selma (2017) - became the first tropical storm on record to strike El Salvador.
Hurricane Barbara (2013)
Tropical Storm Beatriz (1993)

References

Eastern Pacific tropical storms
1997 Pacific hurricane season
1997 in Mexico
Hurricanes in El Salvador
Hurricanes in Nicaragua
Hurricanes in Guatemala
Hurricanes in Guerrero
Hurricanes in Oaxaca
Hurricanes in Chiapas